Louis Germain-Martin (7 November 1872, in Le Puy-en-Velay, Haute-Loire – 4 October 1948, in Paris) was an Independent Radical French politician. He was Minister of Post and Telecommunications in the government of André Tardieu, and later a Budget Minister, before serving three times as Finance minister for much of the first half of the 1930s.

References

1872 births
1948 deaths
People from Le Puy-en-Velay
Politicians from Auvergne-Rhône-Alpes
Independent Radical politicians
French Ministers of Finance
French Ministers of Budget
Members of the 14th Chamber of Deputies of the French Third Republic
Members of the 15th Chamber of Deputies of the French Third Republic
École Nationale des Chartes alumni
Members of the Académie des sciences morales et politiques